John Marples is a multihull sailboat designer who collaborates with Jim Brown.

The pair are responsible for the Constant camber (1970s-present), Seaclipper (1970s-present) and Searunner (1960s-1970) series of trimarans.

See also
Trimaran
Polyreme

References

External links
Searunner Multihulls

Multihull designers
Year of birth missing (living people)
Living people